Scott B. Hayashi (born December 9, 1953) is the eleventh and current bishop of the Episcopal Diocese of Utah.

Early life and family
Hayashi was born in Tacoma, Washington on December 9, 1953. He was educated at the University of Washington, where awarded a Bachelor of Arts degree in social work. Then he attended Harvard Divinity School, earning a Master of Divinity degree in 1981. While at Harvard, Hayashi met his wife, Amy Perlman O'Donnell, who was then a student at Episcopal Divinity School. They have three daughters: Elisabeth, Miyuki, and Katherine.

Priestly career
He was ordained in the Anglican ministry in 1984. His first pastoral appointments were as the vicar of St. John the Baptist Episcopal Mission and St. Dunstan's Episcopal Mission, both in Washington state, 1984–1989. Afterwards, he was rector of the Episcopal Church of the Good Shepherd in Ogden, Utah, 1989–1998; then rector of Christ Church Episcopal Church in Portola Valley/Woodside, California, 1998–2005; and canon to the ordinary in the Episcopal Diocese of Chicago, 2005–2010.

Episcopal career
In the second ballot, Hayashi was elected the 11th Bishop of Utah on May 22, 2010. His consecration took place at The Grand America Hotel in Salt Lake City on November 6, 2010, with the Episcopal Church's presiding bishop, the Most Reverend Katharine Jefferts Schori, serving as the principal consecrator. The following day, Hayashi was installed in a special ceremony at St. Mark's Cathedral, Salt Lake City on November 7, 2010.

In October 2019 Hayashi announced that he would be retiring with elections for the next bishop expected to take place in 2021.

See also
 List of Episcopal bishops of the United States
 Historical list of the Episcopal bishops of the United States
Episcopal Church in the United States of America

References

External links
Episcopal Diocese of Utah Homepage

1953 births
Living people
People from Tacoma, Washington
Harvard Divinity School alumni
University of Washington School of Social Work alumni
People from Ogden, Utah
Episcopal bishops of Utah